Colette (1873–1954) is the pen name of the French novelist Sidonie-Gabrielle Colette.

Colette may also refer to:

People
 Colette (given name)
 Colette (surname)
 Colette of Corbie (1381–1447), French abbess and saint
 DJ Colette (born Colette Marino in 1975), American DJ and house musician

Miscellaneous
 Colette (2013 film), a Czech-Slovak-Dutch film about a prisoner of Auschwitz
 Colette (2018 film), a U.S.-U.K.-Hungary film, starring Keira Knightley as author Colette
 Colette (2020 film), a US short documentary directed by Anthony Giacchino
 Colette (boutique), a Parisian boutique
 Antoine and Colette, a 1962 film by François Truffaut
 Murder of Colette Aram
 Place Colette, a square in Paris, France
 Colette (horse), an Australian thoroughbred racehorse

See also 
 Coletta (disambiguation)
 Collette (disambiguation)
 Collett (disambiguation)